Benedict Calvert may refer to:

Benedict Calvert, 4th Baron Baltimore (1679–1715), English nobleman and politician
Benedict Leonard Calvert (1700–1732), proprietary governor of Maryland
Benedict Swingate Calvert (1722–1788), planter, politician and Loyalist in Maryland during the American Revolution

See also
Charles Benedict Calvert (1808–1864), U.S. Representative from Maryland